James Eric Weaver (born August 4, 1973) is an American former professional baseball pitcher.

External links

1973 births
Living people
Albuquerque Dukes players
American expatriate baseball players in Canada
Anaheim Angels players
Bakersfield Dodgers players
Baseball players from Illinois
Birmingham Barons players
Edmonton Trappers players
Los Angeles Dodgers players
Major League Baseball pitchers
Reading Phillies players
San Antonio Missions players
Seattle Mariners players
Sportspeople from Springfield, Illinois
Tacoma Rainiers players
Vero Beach Dodgers players
American expatriate baseball players in Australia
Adelaide Giants players